Dyan Webber (born April 9, 1966) is an American sprinter. She was a silver medalist in the 4 × 400 m relay at the 1993 IAAF World Indoor Championships. She was a member of the track team at Texas Southern University, and was an alternate for the 4 × 100 m relay at the 1992 Olympics, in which her team won the gold medal. Her son, Corey Thompson, is an NFL linebacker.

Competition record

References 

American female sprinters
World Athletics Indoor Championships medalists
1966 births
Living people
21st-century American women